This chronological list comprises all those who have held the position of manager of Zimbru Chișinău from 1947 to the present day. Interim managers are included, where known.

Managers

Managers by trophies

References

External links
Zimbru coaches at footballfacts(in Russian)
Zimbru at soccerway

FC Zimbru Chișinău
 
Zimbru